Sheldon Anthony Gomes (18 October 1950 – 15 September 2020) was a cricketer who played first-class and List A cricket for Trinidad and Tobago and other Trinidad teams from 1969 to 1983.

Gomes' highest first-class score was 213 against Jamaica in the 1976-77 Shell Shield. That was also his most prolific first-class season, with 633 runs at an average of 70.33 and three centuries.

His brother Larry Gomes played Test cricket for the West Indies. Gomes died in Las Vegas, Nevada, on 15 September 2020.

References

External links
 
 Sheldon Gomes at CricketArchive

1950 births
2020 deaths
Trinidad and Tobago cricketers 
North Trinidad cricketers
East Trinidad cricketers